George I served as Greek Patriarch of Alexandria between 621 and 631, succeeding St. John the Almsgiver. A biography of St. John Chrysostom, reviewed by St. Photios in his Myriobiblos, has been attributed to him, as well as fragments on Psalm 2.

References

7th-century deaths
7th-century Patriarchs of Alexandria
Year of birth unknown
Heraclius